Artur Aleksanyan (born 21 October 1991) is an Armenian Greco-Roman wrestler. He is an Olympic Champion (2016) as well as silver medalist (2021) and bronze medalist (2012), a four-time World Champion (2014, 2015, 2017, 2022), and a five-time European Champion (2012, 2013, 2014, 2018, 2020). Aleksanyan is the second Olympic gold medalist of Armenia since regaining independence in 1991 and is the most decorated Olympian of independent Armenia as well. He has been nicknamed the "White Bear" and is one of the most renowned Armenian athletes of the 21st century.

Career
Aleksanyan was born in Gyumri. He started Greco-Roman wrestling in 2000 under the guidance of his father Gevorg Aleksanyan, an honored coach of Armenia. He competed in several junior tournaments and became a Junior World Champion at 84 kg in 2010. In 2011, Aleksanyan moved up a weight class to 96 kg and began competing as a senior.

After winning the Armenian Championship that same year, Aleksanyan joined the Armenian national Greco-Roman wrestling team. He made his European Championship debut at the 2011 European Wrestling Championships in Dortmund and won the silver medal. The following year, Aleksanyan won a gold medal at the 2012 European Wrestling Championships in Belgrade, winning five matches while only giving up one point. Aleksanyan came in first place at the 2012 Olympic Qualification Tournament in Sofia shortly afterwards and won the right to participate at the 2012 Summer Olympics in London. In the opening round he defeated Daigoro Timoncini (Italy) and in quarterfinals lost to eventual champion Ghasem Rezaei (Iran), but in the repechage rounds defeated Cenk Ildem (Turkey) and Yunior Estrada (Cuba) to win a bronze medal.

He won another gold medal at the 2013 European Wrestling Championships in Tbilisi, making him a two-time European Champion. Upon returning home, the Mayor of Gyumri Samvel Balasanyan received Aleksanyan and congratulated the athlete on his recent victory in the European Championships. Balasanyan thanked Aleksanyan for restating the sporting legacy of Gyumri with his performance and awarded him directly. Later that year he won a silver medal at the 2013 World Wrestling Championships in Budapest.

In 2014, Aleksanyan won the gold medal at the 2014 European Wrestling Championships in Vantaa, winning his third European Championship, and later that year also won the gold medal at the 2014 World Wrestling Championships in Tashkent. This was the first World Championship of his senior career. He defeated Ghasem Rezaei in the semifinals, avenging his Olympic loss, and defeated Oliver Hassler (Germany) in the finals. Aleksanyan was voted the Armenian Athlete of the Year for 2014. The following year, he won his second World Championships by winning another gold medal at the 2015 World Wrestling Championships in Las Vegas. He defeated Rezaei again in the finals. Aleksanyan was voted the Armenian Athlete of the Year for 2015, being named the title for a second year in a row.

Aleksanyan entered his second Olympic competition at the 2016 Summer Olympics in Rio de Janeiro. He won consecutive matches against Daigoro Timoncini (Italy), Alin Alexuc-Ciurariu (Romania), Cenk Ildem (Turkey), and Yasmany Lugo (Cuba) and won the gold medal. This made Aleksanyan the second Olympic gold medalist of an independent Armenia, after Armen Nazaryan in 1996. He also became the first Armenian Olympic Champion of the 21st century. In addition, he is the first to win a second Olympic medal for Armenia and as of the 2016 Olympics is the most decorated Olympic sportsman of his country. Aleksanyan was the first wrestler to win two World Championships in between Olympics followed by winning an Olympic gold medal since Aleksandr Karelin in 1996. He was the flag bearer of Armenia at the closing ceremony.

During the medal ceremony, Aleksanyan revealed a shirt under his Olympic jacket with a portrait of Robert Abajyan, a 19-year-old Armenian junior sergeant who was killed in the 2016 Armenian–Azerbaijani clashes of April earlier that year. He dedicated his medal to the Armenian soldiers protecting the border and the victims of the conflict. Aleksanyan also stated he wore the picture of Abajyan so that the whole world would recognize their heroes and also wished that their heroes would not be forgotten. Ruben Abajyan, the elder brother of Robert, expressed gratitude for Aleksanyan: "It was much unexpected for me, for my family members. I can't explain what emotions I had. I was touched, I felt pride; it's hard to explain." Upon arriving back at Armenia, Aleksanyan was approached and hugged by a man at the airport who revealed himself to be Abajyan's father and thanked Aleksanyan for honoring his son.

In 2019, Aleksanyan lit the second torch for the Pan-Armenian Games at Khor Virap

He won the silver medal in the 97 kg event at the 2020 Summer Olympics held in Tokyo, Japan.

He won the gold medal in the 97kg event at the 2022 World Wrestling Championships held in Belgrade, Serbia.

Personal life
Aleksanyan graduated from the Gyumri State Pedagogical Institute.

His father Gevorg is also his coach and holds the title of Honored Coach of Armenia. He also has a brother named Rafayel.

The wrestling school Aleksanyan trains at was named after him in June 2015 after he won his second World Championship.

He has been nicknamed the "White Bear" by his fans. In addition to wrestling, he also likes to play football.

In October 2016, Aleksanyan became an honorary citizen of Yerevan, along with fellow 2016 Olympic wrestling champion Mihran Harutyunyan.

Awards
Aleksanyan was awarded the Khorenatsi medal in 2012, the "For Merit" 1st degree medal in 2014, and the "For Service to Fatherland" 2nd degree medal in 2015.

References

External links
 
 
 
 

1991 births
Living people
Armenian male sport wrestlers
Olympic wrestlers of Armenia
Olympic gold medalists for Armenia
Olympic silver medalists for Armenia
Olympic bronze medalists for Armenia
Olympic medalists in wrestling
Wrestlers at the 2012 Summer Olympics
Wrestlers at the 2016 Summer Olympics
Wrestlers at the 2020 Summer Olympics
Medalists at the 2012 Summer Olympics
Medalists at the 2016 Summer Olympics
Medalists at the 2020 Summer Olympics
World Wrestling Champions
World Wrestling Championships medalists
European Wrestling Champions
Universiade medalists in wrestling
Universiade silver medalists for Armenia
Medalists at the 2013 Summer Universiade
European Games medalists in wrestling
European Games gold medalists for Armenia
Wrestlers at the 2019 European Games
Ethnic Armenian sportspeople
Shirak State University alumni
Sportspeople from Gyumri